The 1909 Tamworth by-election was held on 16 January 1909.  The by-election was held due to the death of the incumbent Conservative MP, Sir Philip Muntz.  It was won by the Conservative candidate Francis Newdegate, who was unopposed.

References

Tamworth by-election
Tamworth by-election
Tamworth by-election
By-elections to the Parliament of the United Kingdom in Staffordshire constituencies
20th century in Staffordshire
Unopposed by-elections to the Parliament of the United Kingdom (need citation)
Politics of Tamworth, Staffordshire